The 2003 Sydney Roosters season was the 96th in the club's history. Coached by Ricky Stuart and captained by Brad Fittler, the Roosters competed in the National Rugby League's 2003 Telstra Premiership and finished the regular season 2nd (out of 15) before going on to reach the 2003 NRL grand final which they lost to the Penrith Panthers.

A total of four Roosters players, Shannon Hegarty, Anthony Minichiello, Luke Ricketson and Michael Crocker, were selected to make their Test match  débuts for the Australian national team in 2003.

Nine Roosters players were selected to play in the mid-season 2003 State of Origin series: Craig Fitzgibbon, Craig Wing, Luke Ricketson, Bryan Fletcher and Anthony Minichiello for New South Wales; and Shannon Hegarty, Chris Flannery, Justin Hodges and Michael Crocker for Queensland.

Ladder

Sydney Roosters seasons
Sydney Roosters season